Martin Graff (22 June 1944 – 4 August 2021) was a French pastor, writer, screenwriter, and cabaretist.

Biography
After his studies in Protestant theology, he worked for three years as a pastor in Strasbourg and Sarreguemines. He then started a career as a journalist and essayist in German media. He wrote and published in German and French for radio, television, theatre, and cabarets.

Martin Graff died in Soultzeren on 4 August 2021, at the age of 77.

Publications
Vertiges (1984)
L'Allemagne au mois d'août (1985)
Der Joker und der Schmetterling (1987)
Mange ta choucroute et tais-toi (1988)
Le pape est fou (1989)
Zéro partout : pamphlet franco-allemand (1993)
Contes de Noël à rêver debout (1994)
Nous sommes tous des Alsakons, mais ne le répétez à personne (1995)
Von Liebe keine Spur. Das Elsass und die Deutschen (1996)
Le réveil du Danube : géopolitique vagabonde de l'Europe (1998)
Voyage au jardin des frontières (2000)
Invitation à quitter la France (2001)
Roberto et Fabiola (2002)
Champagner für alle (2004)
Le Vagabond des frontières (2010)
Grenzvagabund (2010)
Leben wie Gott im Elsass. Deutsche Fantasien (2012)
Weihnachten. Geschichten
Der lutherische Urknall. die Franzosen und die Deutschen, Morstadt, Kehl am Rhein
Comme l'Allemagne ? : le big bang luthérien

References

1944 births
2021 deaths
French screenwriters
People from Haut-Rhin